Beverly Randolph Wellford (July 29, 1797 – December 27, 1870) was an American physician.

Biography
Born in Fredericksburg, Virginia, he was the son of English physician Robert Wellford—a member of the Royal College of Surgeons, and his wife Catherine Yates. Beverly was educated in medicine by his father before attending lectures at the University of Maryland, where he was awarded his M. D. in the Spring of 1816. Following graduation, he returned home to practice medicine with his father. In 1817 he was married to his first wife, Betty Burwell Page. The couple had one daughter before Betty died in 1818. In 1824, he married his second wife, Mary Alexander, and the couple had six children, five of them boys.

In 1851, he was elected president of the Virginia Medical Association. During 1852-53, he served as sixth president of the American Medical Association. He was named professor of materia medica and therapeutics for the Medical College of Virginia in 1854; a chair he held until he retired in 1868 as professor emeritus. His elder son, John S. Wellford, succeeded his position at the College. Following a stroke that left him paralyzed, Beverly Wellford battled a protracted illness, before dying in Richmond, Virginia, on December 27, 1870.

References

External links
 
 

1797 births
1870 deaths
Physicians from Virginia
People from Fredericksburg, Virginia
American people of English descent
Burials at Hollywood Cemetery (Richmond, Virginia)
Presidents of the American Medical Association